John-Roger Hinkins (born Roger Delano Hinkins) (September 24, 1934 – October 22, 2014) was an American author, public speaker, and founder of the Movement of Spiritual Inner Awareness (MSIA), as well as several other New Age, spiritual, and self-help organizations.

Biography

Early life and education
Hinkins was born on September 24, 1934, and raised in the small mining town of Rains, Utah. He was brought up in the Mormon faith, As a youth, he attended the local LDS church's Young Men's Mutual Improvement Association and occasionally gave inspirational "three-minute talks". Hinkins described his childhood as "typical", distinguished only by an early belief that he could spot auras, colorful fields that some people believe surround the human body. After graduating from high school, Hinkins attended the University of Utah in Salt Lake City, where he earned a Bachelor of Science degree in psychology in 1958 and a Secondary Teaching credential in 1960. While in college, he worked as a night orderly in the psychiatric hospital ward of a Salt Lake City hospital. He then moved to San Francisco to work as an insurance claims adjuster.

He received a Secondary Life Teaching Credential from the State of California, and performed post-graduate work at University of California, Los Angeles, University of Southern California and California State University, Los Angeles. He then began teaching English at Rosemead High School in a suburb of Los Angeles.

The Mystical Traveler
Hinkins relates having had a near-death experience while undergoing surgery for a kidney stone in late 1963, after which he fell into a nine-day coma. After this experience, Hinkins says he became aware of another "spiritual personality" that had superseded or merged with his previous personality. He began to refer to himself as "John-Roger" in recognition of this transformation.

Hinkins has written that during the surgery he had an experience that all things were “in the Light” – that everything was completely safe, protected and perfect, and that following the surgery he began to experience this higher consciousness expressing more and more into the physical world – i.e. that he could see and perceive everything taking place in this physical world as being perfect in some greater sense, “as being part of a greater whole, part of the highest good”. He says that, following the experience, he was able to move back to this state of mind when faced with challenging and difficult times, and that he became “more understanding, kinder, and able to respond and act in a way that was based on the good of everyone, not on his own personal perspective."<ref name="whenareyoucominghome">John-Roger Sanderson, Pauli, When Are You Coming Home? A Personal Guide to Soul Transcendence” (Los Angeles: Mandeville, 2004), p. 70,71.</ref>

Hinkins termed this consciousness the "Mystical Traveler Consciousness" and says that he was given the "keys" or began to "anchor" the Consciousness on the planet after the surgery. He further says there has always been someone on the planet "anchoring" the consciousness to assist individuals spiritually, and has made this idea a tenet of Movement of Spiritual Inner Awareness (MSIA), the spiritual movement he founded. According to Hinkins, he was passed the "keys" by the previous receptor of the Consciousness, Sawan Singh, the late Radhasoami Satsang Beas master who died in 1948, while he was on the "inner spiritual planes". Hinkins held the "keys" to the Consciousness from December 1963 until they were passed to John Morton, the current Spiritual Director of MSIA, in December 1988.

Hinkins maintains that humans are locked in an eternal cycle of reincarnation and karma, and can only escape by ascending from Earth's negative realms into "a totally positive state of being" called "soul consciousness." This, according to his teachings, is nearly impossible without the assistance of the Mystical Traveler Consciousness he believes he embodies. He has written that "Initiates of the Mystical Traveler Consciousness are those that I am specifically taking home to God."

MSIA
In 1968, five years after his coma, Hinkins began to hold seminars as an independent spiritual teacher in homes of friends in Santa Barbara and Thousand Oaks. The demand for his seminars grew, until in 1971, Hinkins resigned from his secular job as a high school English teacher and formally incorporated the Church of the Movement of Spiritual Inner Awareness.
MSIA is a nondenominational and ecumenical church, the stated purpose of which is to "teach Soul Transcendence, which is becoming aware of yourself as a Soul and as one with God, not as a theory, but as a living reality." MSIA currently has participants in over 30 countries, with its largest following in the United States, Australia, Colombia, Brazil, and Nigeria respectively. The church was estimated in 1993 to have 4500 members.

Controversy has surrounded MSIA: it has been accused of being a cult by some former members and by the Cult Awareness and Information Centre, and claims have been made that Hinkins had unethical sexual relationships with members.

MSIA has also been accused of being an "offshoot" of Lifespring, a private, for-profit, New Age/human potential training company founded in 1974. According to Nan Kathryn Fuchs, a long-time devoted member of MSIA and a minister who served on the Ministerial Board for a number of years, Hinkins' teachings changed substantially in tone when Russell Bishop introduced his version of Lifespring Training to a group of MSIA ministers and John-Roger adopted the method, calling it "Insight Training Seminars". Russell Bishop ran the new Insight Seminars.

Regarding this time, Nan Fuchs wrote, "As the money began to roll in, John-Roger became more inaccessible, and his aphorisms changed from 'Help yourself so you can help others' to 'Use everything to your advantage'. He certainly has."

Other organizations founded
In addition to MSIA, Hinkins has founded several other non-profit organizations. In 1976, he founded Koh-e-nor University, later renamed the University of Santa Monica (USM), a private, unaccredited institution offering a master's degree in Spiritual Psychology.  Prior to his death, Hinkins served as the chancellor of the University.

In 1977 Hinkins founded the Peace Theological Seminary & College of Philosophy (PTS). An educational non-profit organization, PTS offers undergraduate workshops, courses and retreats, and postgraduate programs centered on the teachings of MSIA. The school, which is ecumenical and non-denominational, offers Masters and Doctorate degrees in Spiritual Science. Its headquarters is home to the Peace Awareness Labyrinth and Gardens. Hinkins received his doctorate in Spiritual Science from this organization, and is its President.

In 1978 Hinkins created the Insight organization with friend and fellow MSIA Minister Russell Bishop. Insight Seminars is an international non-profit educational organization headquartered in Santa Monica, California. Hinkins serves as Insight Seminars' Chairman of the Board.

In 1979, Hinkins founded the Heartfelt Foundation, a volunteer-driven, 501(c)(3) non-profit organization dedicated to serving and assisting people in any form of need.

In 1982, Hinkins founded the Institute for Individual and World Peace (IIWP), a volunteer-driven 501(c)(3) non-profit organization dedicated to studying, identifying, and presenting the processes that lead to peace. IIWP owns and operates the Windermere Ranch, a 142-acre property in the Santa Ynez Mountains that is used to breed and train Arabian horses.

Author and filmmaker
Hinkins is the author of over 55 books. His most recent books are 'The Rest of Your Life' (2007), 'Timeless Wisdoms: Volume One' (2008) and 'Timeless Wisdoms: Volume Two' (2008). He has given more than 6000 seminars over the last forty years, most of which have been recorded either in audio or video format by NOW Productions. Hinkins also produces his own national cable TV show, 'That Which Is', and has appeared on other television and radio programs, including CNN's Larry King Live, The Roseanne Show, and Politically Incorrect.

In 1988, Hinkins partnered with actor Jsu Garcia to create 'Scott J-R Productions', a film production company committed to creating "spirit-filled" films. Their first full-length feature was 'My Little Havana', followed by 'Spiritual Warriors', based on Hinkins' book 'Spiritual Warrior: The Art of Spiritual Living'.

Notable followers and associates
Several well-known individuals and public figures have worked with, or, with varying levels of dedication, have been associated with Hinkins since the 1970s. The most prominent of these is Arianna Huffington.Rolling Stone profile, 4 December 2006 Other notable students of Hinkins are the Beach Boys' Carl Wilson, actress Jaime King-Newman, actress Sally Kirkland, an MSIA minister since 1975, actress Leigh Taylor-Young, also an MSIA minister since 1975, actor Jsu Garcia, and author and management consultant David Allen. Author Peter McWilliams was also an MSIA minister but later repudiated MSIA and made a series of personal allegations against MSIA leader John-Roger in his book Life 102: What to Do When Your Guru Sues You.Peter McWilliams, Life 102: What to Do When Your Guru Sues You (Prelude Press: Los Angeles, 1994). ., pp 6-7.

Accusations of cultism, criminal conduct and abuse
In the 1980s and early 1990s, several former members of MSIA accused Hinkins of various crimes and abuses, including high-tech charlatanism, the sexual coercion of young male staffers, brainwashing and intimidation, and plagiarism. These allegations, as well as the revelation of the high-profile Arianna Huffington's association with the group, led to a series of investigations by publications such as People, Playboy, the Los Angeles Times and Vanity Fair. MSIA began to be referred to by some elements of the media as a cult. Cult expert and psychologist Steven Hassan, when asked by ABC News Nightline's Ted Koppel if MSIA qualified as a cult, responded:

Charlatanism
Dissidents in the organization say Hinkins employed covert listening devices at MSIA's Santa Monica headquarters to support his claim of possessing extrasensory perception. One disenchanted member claimed "What people thought was J-R's clairvoyance was just his cunning and deceitful information gathering."

Former MSIA member Terry O'Shaughnessy described to the Los Angeles Times how, in the course of installing sound equipment he and a co-worker found tiny microphones hidden in every room of the Insight headquarters. He later discovered that the microphones all fed into a switch arrangement in John-Roger's personal office, and learned they had been installed by members of John-Roger's personal staff.

O'Shaughnessy's wife, Susan, recounted that former MSIA member Michael Hesse told her he had installed recording devices on the telephones at the Insight headquarters. "I realized that so much of what I thought was psychic power was good old electronics," she said.

Insight facilitators reported that John-Roger monitored Insight training seminars via remote controlled video cameras connected to his private office.

Sexual coercion
Susan and Wendell Whitmore, who joined MSIA in the early '70s, finally decided to leave MSIA in 1983 after several male staff members confessed during an informal group discussion that Hinkins had used spiritual threats and promises to coerce them into having sex with him. The Whitmores claim that MSIA members had been led to believe that Hinkins had taken a vow of celibacy, and therefore did not question the series of attractive young men that stayed in his house. "He always had someone sleeping in his bedroom at night, supposedly to protect his body while he was out of it," says Whitmore. Former MSIA members charge that staffers who submitted to their leader's sexual advances were promoted to positions of authority and were praised by Hinkins for their spiritual qualities. Ex-MSIA member Victor Toso, said that although he was not homosexual, he consented to Hinkins's requests for sex because he feared being expelled from the MSIA staff. "Whenever we fell out of line, having another sexual encounter with him was sort of required to seal us back in the brotherhood," said Toso.

Intimidation
Wesley Whitmore, Wendell's twin brother and also former MSIA staffer, recalls that in "contrast to his public behavior, Hinkins in private was often angry, vindictive and bizarre, occasionally shouting that he was under attack from negative forces." He and his wife said that their devotion to Hinkins kept them from addressing these issues.

According to Susan Whitmore, MSIA defectors hesitated to challenge Hinkins publicly even after leaving the movement "because we were made to be afraid." She claims that Hinkins would declare that people who questioned him had placed themselves "under the Kal (a devil-like spirit) power and its field of negativity, known as the Red Monk," and would essentially be warning that members who associated with defectors risked spiritual disaster. The Whitmore alleges that one woman was told she had had a miscarriage because she had hugged one of the defectors.

"The Red Monk . . . seemed to me to be a scare tactic to keep people from talking to each other," said David Welles, a chiropractor who worked at the John-Roger Foundation's holistic health center before leaving the movement in 1984.

The Whitmores also claim that after they left MSIA, their cars were vandalized, they received obscene letters accusing them of homosexuality, and phone calls in which threats were made on their lives. Similarly, Eve Cohen, the daughter of ex-MSIA ministers Matthew and Ellen Cohen, and at the time a teenager, received a letter graphically alleging that her father had had sexual acts with other men. The letter claimed to be from a friend of Eve's in Los Angeles.

Several other former MSIA members also claim to have been harassed during the time of the Red Monk scare: former Insight facilitator Jack Canfield and East Coast organizer Michael Bookbinder said they were subjected to threatening phone calls and bizarre, harassing letters. They believe that the calls and letters came from church insiders and, in certain cases, John-Roger himself.

Religion academic and writer David C. Lane claims that in the fall of 1983, after he called Hinkins, who at that time he considered to be a friend, to get his response to the allegations of plagiarism, sexual manipulation, and charlatanism that had been raised by other friends, he was subjected to a series of threats, including several made against his life and the lives of his friends/informants. His home was subsequently ransacked and a number of his research files were stolen. He claims that documentary evidence implicates John-Roger with the robbery, as well as with implementing a smear campaign including threats against Lane and other of his critics. This included setting up a front organization called the "Coalition for Civil and Spiritual Rights", an act which was eventually traced directly back to Hinkins.

Plagiarism
Claims of plagiarism have also been levied against Hinkins, in connection with both MSIA's core teachings and as other publications. Many of these have centered on the reportedly close similarity between certain MSIA materials and doctrine and that of Paul Twitchell's Eckankar, known prior to 1985 as "The Ancient Science of Soul Travel". One of the main allegers, religion academic David C. Lane, has published evidence that Hinkins took without attribution key spiritual teachings from Twitchell, who, Lane further claims, took them in turn from Radha Soami Satsang Beas, a movement with which Lane was at the time actively involved.

Hinkins, himself, admits that he had some level of involvement with the group: around the time of his surgery and religious experience, he had been exploring a variety of different spiritual teachings, and these explorations included Eckankar. Religion scholar James R. Lewis, in his book on Hinkins and MSIA, quotes a conversation in which Hinkins acknowledges that he studied with Eckankar, had a private interview with Twitchell, and received information from the group stating that he was an initiate, but denies being formally initiated into the group.

Nonetheless, side-by-side text comparisons of materials published by Lane appear to clearly show that Hinkins copied nearly verbatim, Twitchell's idiosyncratic cosmology (as found in Twitchell's 1971 The Spiritual Notebook) in his own 1976 publication The Sound Current. Hinkins also appears to have clearly plagiarized in his work Affirmations (1981) from Florence Scovel Shinn's book, The Game of Life and How to Play It (DeVorss & Company, 1925).

In 1994, Peter McWilliams, a former high-level member of MSIA, published Life 102: What to Do When Your Guru Sues You, which charged that Hinkins had repeatedly abused his power as a guru. McWilliams claimed, among other things, that he was the sole author of the highly successful Life 101 and several subsequent books purportedly coauthored by Hinkins (as "John-Roger"), who was his spiritual adviser and church leader at the time. Hinkins countered with a libel lawsuit. Ultimately, McWilliams agreed to abandon the copyright to Life 102: What to Do When Your Guru Sues You to Hinkins to settle the suit.

Defense against cult charges
James R. Lewis, an academic who researches new religious movements, conducted a study of Hinkins and the Movement of Spiritual Inner Awareness. Lewis stated that he did not consider MSIA a cult.Lewis's book was published by Mandeville Press, the publishing organ of MSIA. Lewis has been accused by skeptical societies and anti-cult groups of serving as an apologist for several cults, including the Family and AUM Shinrikyo.

Later life and death
Shortly after the publicized scandals that rocked MSIA during 1988 Hinkins announced that he had passed the "keys" to the Mystical Traveler Consciousness to protégé John Morton. He continued to participate in MSIA and PTS annual events until his death at the age of 80, on October 22, 2014, at his home in Los Angeles, California, from pneumonia.

List of works

Books

 Answers to Life's Questions (2000) 
 Answers to Life's Questions, Spanish Edition: Preguntas y Respuestas para la vida (2001) 
 Awakening Into Light (1976) 
 Blessings of Light (1981) 
 Buddha Consciousness (1976) 
 The Christ Within, Disciples of Christ with the Cosmic Christ Calendar (1994) 
 The Christ Within, Spanish Edition: el Cristo Interno, Los discipulos De Cristo y el Calendario del Cristo Cosmico (1995) 
 The Consciousness of a Soul (1993) 
 Consciousness of Wealth (1976) 
 Divine Essence (Baraka) (1973) (1982) (2000) 
 Divine Essence, Portuguese Edition: Divine Essence (2004) 
 Do It! Let's Get Off Our Buts (with Peter McWilliams) (1992) 
 Dream Voyages (1977) (1992) 
 Dream Voyages, Spanish Edition: Viajes Durante Los Suenos (1991) 
 Dream Voyages, French Edition: Voyages Dans Les Reves (1997) 
 The Dynamics of the Lower Self (1976) 
 The Dynamics of the Lower Self, Spanish Edition: La Dinamica Del Ser Basico (1982) (1995) 
 Forgiveness: The Key to the Kingdom (1994) 
 Forgiveness, Spanish Edition: Perdonar, La Llave del Reino (1995) 
 Forgiveness, Portuguese Edition: Title in Portuguese? (2004) 
 Forgiveness, French Edition: Le Pardon, La Clé Du Royaume (1997) 
 Fulfilling The Spiritual Promise (2006) 
 Fulfilling The Spiritual Promise e-book, Kindle: Fulfilling The Spiritual Promise (2009) 
 Fulfilling The Spiritual Promise e-book, pdf: Fulfilling The Spiritual Promise (2009) 
 Fulfilling The Spiritual Promise e-book, Sony: Fulfilling The Spiritual Promise (2009) 
 God Is Your Partner (New Edition) (1990) (2007) 
 God Is Your Partner e-book, Kindle: God Is Your Partner (2009) 
 God Is Your Partner e-book, pdf: God Is Your Partner (2009) 
 God Is Your Partner e-book, Sony: God Is Your Partner (2009) 
 God Is Your Partner, Spanish Edition: Dios es Tu Socio (1991) (1994) (1996) (1998) 
 Inner Worlds of Meditation (1976) 
 Inner Worlds of Meditation, Spanish Edition: Mundos Internos de la Meditacion (1988) (1996) 
 Interviews with John-Roger and John Morton (1999) 
 Journey of a Soul (New Edition) (1975) (2000) (2001) 
 Journey of a Soul, Spanish Edition: El Camino del Alma (1991) (1997) 
 Living Love from the Spiritual Heart (2006) 
 Living Love e-book, Kindle: Living Love (2009) 
 Living Love e-book, pdf: Living Love (2009) 
 Living Love e-book, Sony: Living Love (2009) 
 Living Love, Spanish Edition: Amor Viviente (2006) 
 Loving Each Day (1998) (2000) 
 Loving Each Day, Spanish Edition: Amando Cada Dia (1993) 
 Loving Each Day for Moms and Dads (2001) 
 Loving Each Day for Moms and Dads, Spanish Edition: Amando Cada Dia para Mamas y Papas 
 Loving Each Day for Peacemakers (2002) 
 Loving Each Day for Peacemakers, Spanish Edition: Amando Cada Dia Para los que hacen la Paz (2003) 
 Manual on Using the Light (1976) 
 Manual on Using the Light, Spanish Edition: Manual para el uso de la Luz (1995) 
 Momentum: Letting Love Lead (with Dr. Paul Kaye) (2003) 
 Momentum e-book, Kindle: Momentum: Letting Love Lead (with Dr. Paul Kaye) (2009) 
 Momentum e-book, pdf: Momentum: Letting Love Lead (with Dr. Paul Kaye) (2009) 
 Momentum e-book, Sony: Momentum: Letting Love Lead (with Dr. Paul Kaye) (2009) 
 Momentum, Spanish Edition: Momentum: Dejando que Guie el Amor (2003) 
 Music is the Message (1980) 
 Passage Into Spirit (1984) (2000) 
 Passage Into Spirit e-book, Kindle: Passage Into Spirit (2009) 
 Passage Into Spirit e-book, pdf: Passage Into Spirit (2009) 
 Passage Into Spirit e-book, Sony: Passage Into Spirit (2009) 
 The Path to Mastership (1976) (1982) 
 The Power Within You (1976) (1984) 
 The Power Within You, Spanish Edition: La Fuente De Tu Poder (1991) (1998) 
 The Power Within You, French Edition: Le Pouvoir Intérieur (1997) 
 Psychic Protection (1997) 
 Psychic Protection, Spanish Edition: Posesiones Proyecciones Y Entidades (1995) 
 Relationships: Love, Marriage and Spirit (1986) (2000) 
 Relationships e-book, Kindle: Relationships: Love, Marriage and Spirit (2009) 
 Relationships e-book, pdf: Relationships: Love, Marriage and Spirit (2009) 
 Relationships e-book, Sony: Relationships: Love, Marriage and Spirit (2009) 
 Relationships, Spanish Edition: Relaciones: El Arte de Lacer (1990) (1998) 
 The Rest of Your Life: Finding Repose in the Beloved (with Paul Kaye) (2007) 
 The Rest of Your Life e-book, Kindle: The Rest of Your Life (2009) 
 The Rest of Your Life e-book, pdf: The Rest of Your Life (2009) 
 The Rest of Your Life e-book, Sony: The Rest of Your Life (2009) 
 The Rest of Your Life, Spanish Edition: The Rest of Your Life: Finding Repose in the Beloved (with Paul Kaye) (2009) 
 Serving and Giving (2009) 
 Sex, Spirit & You (1977) (1985) (1987) (2000) 
 Sex, Spirit & You e-book, Kindle: Sex, Spirit & You (2009) 
 Sex, Spirit & You e-book, pdf: Sex, Spirit & You (2009) 
 Sex, Spirit & You e-book, Sony: Sex, Spirit & You (2009) 
 Sex, Spirit & You, Spanish Edition: Sexo El Espiritu Y Tu (1986) (1993) (1994) 
 The Signs of the Times (1981) 
 The Sound Current (1975) 
 The Spiritual Family (1976) (1997) 
 The Spiritual Family, Spanish Edition: La Familia Espiritual (1999) 
 Spiritual High (1976) (1994) 
 Spiritual High (New Edition) (2005) 
 Spiritual High e-book, Kindle: Spiritual High (2009) 
 Spiritual High e-book, pdf: Spiritual High (2009) 
 Spiritual High e-book, Sony: Spiritual High (2009) 
 The Spiritual Promise (1973) 
 The Spiritual Promise, Spanish Edition: La Promesa Espiritual (1990) 
 Spiritual Warrior: The Art of Spiritual Living (1998) 
 Spiritual Warrior: The Art of Spiritual Living (New Edition) (2008) 
 Spiritual Warrior e-book, Kindle: Spiritual Warrior (2009) 
 Spiritual Warrior e-book, pdf: Spiritual Warrior (2009) 
 Spiritual Warrior e-book, Sony: Spiritual Warrior (2009) 
 Spiritual Warrior, Spanish Edition: Guerrero Espiritual (1998) 
 Spiritual Warrior, Spanish Edition: Guerrero Espiritual (New Edition) (2008) 
 The Tao of Spirit (1994) 
 The Tao of Spirit, Small Edition: The Tao of Spirit, Volume 1 (1997) 
 The Tao of Spirit, Small Edition: The Tao of Spirit, Volume 2 (1997) 
 Timeless Wisdoms: Volume 1 (2008) 
 Timeless Wisdoms e-book, Kindle: Timeless Wisdoms (2009) 
 Timeless Wisdoms e-book, pdf: Timeless Wisdoms (2009) 
 Timeless Wisdoms e-book, Sony: Timeless Wisdoms (2009) 
 Timeless Wisdoms: Volume 2 (2009) 
 Walking with the Lord (1991) 
 Walking with the Lord, Spanish Edition: Caminando con el Senor (1992) 
 The Way Out Book (1980) 
 The Way Out Book, Spanish Edition: El Camino de Salida (1995) 
 Wealth & Higher Consciousness (1988) 
 Wealth & Higher Consciousness, Spanish Edition: Abundancia y Conciencia Superior (1993) (1997) 
 What's It Like Being You? (with Paul Kaye) (2004) 
 What's It Like Being You? e-book, Kindle: What's It Like Being You? (2009) 
 What's It Like Being You? e-book, pdf: What's It Like Being You? (2009) 
 What's It Like Being You? e-book, Sony: What's It Like Being You? (2009) 
 What's It Like Being You?, Spanish Edition- Como se siente ser tu? (2007) 
 When Are You Coming Home? (with Pauli Sanderson) (2003) 
 When Are You Coming Home? e-book, Kindle: When Are You Coming Home? (2009) 
 When Are You Coming Home? e-book, pdf: When Are You Coming Home? (2009) 
 When Are You Coming Home? e-book, Sony: When Are You Coming Home? (2009) 
 When Are You Coming Home?, Spanish Edition - Cuando regresas a Casa? (2007) 
 You Can't Afford the Luxury of a Negative Thought (New Edition) (with Peter McWilliams) (1995) 
 You Can't Afford the Luxury of a Negative Thought, Spanish Edition: No Se Puede Dar El Lujo De Tener Un Pensamiento negative (with Peter McWilliams) (1991) (1994) 
 You Can't Afford the Luxury of a Negative Thought, Spanish Edition: Un pensamiento Positivo: El Lujo Que Puedes Darte (2004) 
 You Can't Afford the Luxury of a Negative Thought, Workbook Edition: Focus on the Positive: The You Can't Afford the Luxury of a Negative Thought Workbook (1991) 
 You Can't Afford the Luxury of a Negative Thought, Workbook Edition, Spanish: In Spanish: Concentrese en lo Positivo (1991) (1994) 

 Awakening Into Light, Spanish Edition: Despertar dentro de la Luz
 Buddha Consciousness, Spanish Edition: La Consciencia del Buda
 The Consciousness of a Soul, Spanish Edition: La Consciencia del Alma
 Consciousness of Wealth, Spanish Edition: Un Consciencia de Riqueza
 The Cosmic Self
 Baraka, Spanish Edition: Baraka
 Baraka, Indonesian Edition: Esensi Ilahi
 Do it! Let's get off our butts, Spanish Edition: Hagalo Basta de Peros
 Do it! Let's get off our butts, Portable Edition: Do It! Let's Get Off Our Buts
 Forgiveness, Indonesian Edition: Kerelaan Mengampuni
 God Is Your Partner, Portuguese Edition: Dios es meu Socio
 Interviews with John-Roger and John Morton, Spanish Edition: Entrevistas con John-Roger y John Morton
 Life 101 (Peter McWilliams with John-Roger)
 Life 101, Spanish Edition: Vida Optima (Peter McWilliams with John-Roger)
 Life 101, Portable Edition: The Portable Life 101, 179 Essential lessons (Peter McWilliams with John-Roger)
 Meditations for the Awakening Heart
 Passage Into Spirit, Spanish Edition: Pasaje Al Espiritu
 The Path to Mastership, Spanish Edition: El Sendero a La Maestria
 Q & A from the heart with John-Roger / Journal
 Relationships: Love, Marriage and Spirit, Indonesian Edition: Membina Hubungan
 Spiritual Exercises: A Journal of Soul Transcendence
 Spiritual Warrior, Portuguese Edition: O Guerrero Espiritual
 Spiritual Warrior, French Edition: Le Guerrier Spirituel: L'Art de Vivre la Spiritualite
 Spiritual Warrior, Indonesian Edition: Ksatria Rohani
 The Tao of Spirit, Spanish Edition: El Tao del Espiritu
 Wisdoms of the Spiritual Heart
 You Can't Afford the Luxury of Negative Thought, Workbook Edition: A Guide to Positive Thinking
 Wealth 101
 We Give To Love

Audio
 The Anointed One, CD set (2006) 
 Health from the Inside Out, CD set (2006) 
 Inner Worlds of Meditation, CD (1998) 
 Inner Worlds of Meditation (incl. Master Chohan), CD set (1997) 
 Joyful Meditations, CD set (2005) 
 Living In Grace, CD set (2005) 
 Momentum, CD set (2005) 
 Money, The Great Mirror of Consciousness, CD set 
 Turning Points to Personal Liberation, CD set (2006) 

Video
 Journey To The East, DVD set 
 Moments of Peace, Video (1999) 
 Spiritual Warriors Movie, DVD, UPC: 700261245539

 Related organizations founded by John-Roger 
 Peace Theological Seminary & College of Philosophy (PTS)
 University of Santa Monica (USM)
 Institute for Individual and World Peace (IIWP)
 Insight Seminars
 Heartfelt Foundation
 Mandeville Press

References

External links

General
 Hinkins' websitePeople Magazine'' article on Hinkins 

Organizations controlled and/or started by Hinkins
 Heartfelt Foundation
 Institute for Individual & World Peace
 Insight Seminars
 Mandeville Press, MSIA publisher
 The New Daily Herald, MSIA newsletter
 MSIA
 Peace Theological Seminary & College of Philosophy
 University of Santa Monica

1934 births
2014 deaths
Former Latter Day Saints
Founders of new religious movements
Movement of Spiritual Inner Awareness
People from Carbon County, Utah
People involved in plagiarism controversies
University of Utah alumni